Ramiro Washington Bruschi (born September, 1981 in Tacuarembó) is a Uruguayan retired football forward who last played for C.D. Olimpia in the Liga Nacional de Honduras.

References

1981 births
Living people
Uruguayan footballers
Tacuarembó F.C. players
Peñarol players
C.D. Olimpia players
Tela F.C. players
Expatriate footballers in Honduras
Liga Nacional de Fútbol Profesional de Honduras players
Honduran Liga Nacional de Ascenso players
Association football forwards